USS Edgecombe is a name used more than once by the U.S. Navy:

 , a World War I cargo ship used by the Navy.
 , an attack transport commissioned 30 October 1944.

See also
 , an Altair-class destroyer tender

United States Navy ship names